Heart Talk is a 2008 Khmer horror film, a second film produced by Khmer Mekong Films after the successful of 2007's romantic comedy Staying Single When and a television series, the Taste of Life. It is directed by UK director Bill Broomfield and Cambodian young director, Tom Som and written by British novelist and screenwriter with much personal experience of Cambodia, Matt Baylis, but translated into Khmer script by Kiri Roat.

Plot 
A pacy contemporary thriller about three attractive female presenters at a chic but troubled Phnom Penh radio station. Two of them, Chantha and Kim, disappear as the story progresses, possibly murdered. However, the third, Maly, receives threats and feels her life is constantly in danger and before it's too late to save her life, she must reveal the murderous who truly near her every minute and she can't explain what kind of criminal, supernatural or reality?

Shooting and Release 
The film spend only around a month to shooting which started on Saturday 7 June 2008 and wrapped on Sunday 6 July.
Heart Talk is a fully funded 100-minute film and will be available (with English subtitles) for release in October 2008.

References

External links 
 

2008 films
Khmer-language films
2008 horror films
Cambodian horror films